Angola competed at the 2000 Summer Paralympics in Sydney, Australia. It was the country's second participation at the Paralympic Games, as the lengthy Angolan Civil War continued. It was represented by a single athlete - André Augusto, who competed in the men's 800 metre sprint, T46 category. He did not win a medal, finishing sixth out of eight in the event's single round, in 2:00.92. (Côte d'Ivoire's Oumar Basakoulba Kone won the race in 1:58.36.)

Team 
Angola sent 1 participants to the Sydney Games, a man, André Augusto.  It was the country's second participation at the Paralympic Games, as the lengthy Angolan Civil War continued.

Full results
André Augusto competed in the men's 800 metre sprint, T46 category. He did not win a medal, finishing sixth out of eight in the event's single round, in 2:00.92.  His event was won by Côte d'Ivoire's Oumar Basakoulba Kone won the race in 1:58.36.

See also
Angola at the Paralympics
Angola at the 2000 Summer Olympics

External links
International Paralympic Committee

References 

Nations at the 2000 Summer Paralympics
2000
Summer Paralympics